The Questionnaire Handicap  was an American Thoroughbred horse race named in honor of the horse Questionnaire who was bred and raced by James Butler, the late president and owner of Empire City Race Track. The race was held from its inception in 1938 through 1942 at the Empire City RaceTrack in Yonkers, New York but   with the United States becoming involved in World War II, in 1943 rationing and other wartime limitations resulted in the Empire City Association's decision to go back to hosting only harness racing. The Questionnaire Handicap was then moved to the Jamaica Race Course where it would run under the sponsorship of the Empire City Association through 1953 when it had its final running.

While never a major race, the Questionnaire Handicap drew some of the best horses of the day and from the top racing stables.

Race distances:
1938-1943, 1947-1952 : 1 miles on dirt
1944-1946, 1953 : 1 miles on dirt

Notable events
In 1950, One Hitter set a new Jamaica track record of 1:42 2/5 for a mile and a sixteenth on dirt.

In 1951 there was a dead heat for first between Arise and Bryan G.

The 1953 race was won by 1951 Kentucky Derby winner Count Turf owned by New York City restaurateur Jack Amiel.

Records
Speed record:
 At 1 miles : One Hitter (1950), 1:42 2/5
 At 1 miles : Princequillo (1944), 2:43 flat
Most wins by a jockey:
 2 - Sam Renick (1938, 1939)
 2 - Don Meade (1940, 1942)
 2 - Eric Guerin (1949, 1951)
 2 - Conn McCreary (1952, 1953)

Most wins by a trainer:
 2 - Max Hirsch (1938, 1940)

Winners

 † In 1951 there was a dead heat for first.

References

Empire City Race Track
Jamaica Race Course
Graded stakes races in the United States
Discontinued horse races
Horse races in New York (state)
Recurring sporting events established in 1938
Recurring sporting events disestablished in 1953